Battle Hill is the highest natural point in Brooklyn, New York, United States, at  above sea level. The hill is part of the Harbor Hill Moraine, a terminal moraine formed during the last glacial period.
Battle Hill, located in what is today Green-Wood Cemetery, received its name from the battle which occurred on its slopes between American troops under the immediate command of General Samuel Holden Parsons and British troops under the command of General James Grant.

The fighting occurred on August 27, 1776 during the Battle of Brooklyn, the largest battle of the American Revolutionary War. The Americans inflicted the largest number of casualties against the British troops on the slopes of Battle Hill. Among the many casualties in the fight was British Colonel James Grant of the 40th Regiment of Foot: When the Americans viewed his name, which was sewn into his headgear, they erroneously believed they had killed General Grant.

Battle Hill is also known as Gowan's Heights, and was historically part of the Heights of Guan.

Several monuments are sited on the hill, most prominent being the bronze statue Altar to Liberty: Minerva by sculptor Frederick Ruckstull, sponsored by local businessman Charles M. Higgins in 1920. Minerva faces the Statue of Liberty across the harbor, and there has been a community effort to make this a protected view, a distinction so far only held in New York City by the Brooklyn Heights Promenade.

See also
 Battle Pass
 Old Stone House

References

Battles of the New York Campaign
Landforms of Brooklyn
Hills of New York (state)
1776 in New York (state)